Aina Cid Centelles (born 1 September 1994) is a Spanish competitive rower.

She competed at the 2016 Summer Olympics in Rio de Janeiro, in the women's coxless pair.

Cid rowed for the Ohio State Buckeyes from 2014 to 2017, and helped the team to an NCAA national championship title in 2015.

References

External links
 
 

1994 births
Living people
Spanish female rowers
Olympic rowers of Spain
Rowers at the 2016 Summer Olympics
Ohio State Buckeyes rowers
Sportswomen from Catalonia
Rowers at the 2020 Summer Olympics
21st-century Spanish women